The 2016 Kansas Democratic presidential caucuses took place on March 5 in the U.S. state of Kansas as one of the Democratic Party's primaries ahead of the 2016 presidential election.

On the same day, Democratic primaries were held in Louisiana and in Nebraska, while the Republican Party held primaries in four states including their own Kansas caucuses.

Opinion polling

Results

Analysis
As he did throughout most other states that held caucuses, as well as most farm belt and Great Plains states, Bernie Sanders defeated Hillary Clinton by a two-to-one margin in Kansas, one of the reddest states in the nation. Sanders ran up big margins in urban areas including Kansas City, Lawrence, Topeka, and Wichita, but also won in very rural areas. He won all four congressional districts in the state, never dipping below 60% of the vote. His worst showing was in Kansas's Third Congressional District which borders Missouri, where he received 62% of the vote.

References

Kansas
Democratic primary
2016
March 2016 events in the United States